Cycling competitions at the 2015 Pan American Games in Toronto were held July 10 to 25, 2015 at four different venues. The BMX competitions took place at the Centennial Park Pan Am BMX Centre in Toronto, the mountain biking competitions happened at the Hardwood Ski and Bike (Hardwood Mountain Bike Park) in Oro-Medonte, due to naming rights the venue was known as the latter for the duration of the games. The road races happened in the streets of Downtown Toronto with the start and finish being adjacent to the  Ontario Place West Channel. Finally the track cycling events occurred at the Milton Velodrome in Milton. The road cycling time trials happened in the streets surrounding the velodrome (Milton Time Trial Course).

Competition schedule

The following was the competition schedule for the cycling competitions:

FL = Flying Lap, PR = Points Race, ER = Elimination Race, IP = Individual Pursuit, SR = Scratch Race, TT = Time Trial

Medal table

Medalists

BMX

Mountain biking

Road cycling

Track cycling

Participation
A total of 24 countries qualified athletes. The number of athletes a nation entered is in parentheses beside the name of the country.

Qualification

A total of 228 cyclists qualified to compete at the games (146 in road and track combined, 36 in mountain biking and 38 in BMX). A nation was able to enter at most 24 athletes (16 among road and track cycling, four in mountain biking and four in BMX). The host nation (Canada) automatically entered a full team of 24 athletes (14 male and 10 female).

See also
Cycling at the 2016 Summer Olympics

References

 
Events at the 2015 Pan American Games
Pan American Games
2015
Pan American Games
2015 in track cycling
2015 in BMX
2015 in mountain biking
International cycle races hosted by Canada